Charlie Harper (born David Charles Perez, 25 May 1944) is a British singer, best known as the lead vocalist of the punk band UK Subs.

Biography
Charlie Harper was born in London but moved to the Sussex countryside when he was eight years old. Harper is reportedly a nephew of actor Cesar Romero.Harper attended a "radical secondary school" where he was the Chairman of the Young Farmer's Club. He left school at the age of 15 to start a hairdressing apprenticeship. Following the apprenticeship, Harper began busking, playing the guitar and harmonica. In 1970, Harper got married and began working as a hairdresser at his sister-in-law's shop.

A former hairdresser, he was already a veteran of the London R&B scene at the time of the UK Subs being formed in 1976. His first band in 1964 was named Charlie Harper Free Press Band. Prior to performing as the UK Subs, he was the frontman and founder of The Marauders who were a pub rock band. After seeing a couple of punk rock shows at The Roxy, the band changed their name to the Subversives and started playing punk rock. The name was eventually shortened to the U.K. Subs.

In 1980 his solo single release "Barmy London Army" spent one week at #68 in the UK Singles Chart. He has also recorded with his side project The Urban Dogs and released a solo album entitled Stolen Property and a second solo single "Freaked". As well as singing he also plays the harmonica and bass, he played rhythm guitar on the UK Subs album Diminished Responsibility. He still typically performs between 150 and 200 gigs per year with the UK Subs.

Discography

Solo

Albums
 Stolen Property (1981), Flicknife

Singles
 "Barmy London Army"/"Talk Is Cheap" (1980), Gem
 "Freaked"/"Jo" (1981), Ramkup - UK Indie no. 17

with UK Subs
see U.K. Subs discography

with The Urban Dogs

Albums
 Urban Dogs (1983), Fall Out - UK Indie no. 18
 No Pedigree (1985), Flicknife
 Wipeout Beach (1998), Raw Power
 Bonefield (2012), Time and Matter
 Attack! (2016), Time and Matter

Singles
 "New Barbarians" (1982), Fall Out - UK Indie no. 15
 "Limo Life" (1983), Fall Out - UK Indie no. 16
 "(We Don't Want No) Millenium Dome" (1999), Raw Power
 "Rebellion Song" (2014), Time and Matter
 "Trick or Treat" (2016), Time and Matter

with Charlie's Harbour Rats
 "Rollin' In My Sweet Baby's Arms" single (2012), Punkerama

with Captain Sensible
 Too Much Reality EP (2013), Time and Matter

Compilations
 New Barbarians: The Best Of Charlie Harper And The Urban Dogs (1999), Captain Oi!

Recorded tributes
 "Charlie Harper" - a track by The Bus Station Loonies appeared on their "Bare Faced Hypocrisy Sells Records" EP on the Ruptured Ambitions label in 1998. A different version was on their 1999 Mad Frank's Zonal Disco album.                           
Charlie Harper a song recorded and written by Demob. Unreleased to date. A live version on YouTube.
"Uncle Charlie" is a tribute song by Anti-Nowhere League from their LP The Cage.

References

External links

 [ UK Subs biography] at AllMusic
 Official UK Subs website
 UK Subs Online Archive

1944 births
Living people
English male singers
Singers from London
People from Hackney Central
English punk rock singers
English people of Mexican descent